Duluth FC is an amateur men's soccer club based in Duluth, Minnesota. The club currently competes in the NPSL Midwest Region’s North Conference. The club's colors are green and blue, and plays its home matches at Duluth East High School's Ordean Stadium.

History
Duluth FC was founded in 2015 by Father Timothy Sas. In their inaugural season (2015), the club competed in the Duluth Amateur Soccer League. The club joined the American Premier League for the 2016 season, placing second in their six-team division.

On December 15, 2016, NPSL announced that Duluth FC would join the league as an expansion team for the 2017 season, and would compete in the NPSL Midwest Region’s North Conference. On July 15th, 2017; Duluth FC defeated the Sioux Falls Thunder in the final game of the season to win the NPSL North Conference.

Duluth FC is unique in the sense that it requires its players and supporters to follow certain rules when it comes to match day behavior, requesting that both avoid swearing and other forms of offensive language. Duluth FC are most commonly known as "The BlueGreens," coming from the colors blue and green in Duluth's city flag.

On February 6, 2019, it was announced that 2019 home games would be held at Duluth East's Ordean Stadium while their previous home field, Public Schools Stadium, was undergoing construction. Ordean Stadium has approximately half the seating capacity of Public Schools Stadium.

In November 2022, the club ownership was transferred to Olympic curling gold medalist John Shuster and local businessman Alex Giuliani.

Front office
John Shuster – Owner
Alex Giuliani – Owner
Charlie Forsyth – Director of Operations
Blake Hewitt – Director of Marketing

Managers 
 2015: Tim Sas
 2016–2017: Kyle Bakas
 2018–2019: Joel Person
 2020–present: Sean Morgan

Year-By-Year (All Competitions)

Historic record vs opponents 

*Team folded

Honors 
NPSL
 NPSL Midwest North Conference (1): 2017
NPSL Midwest Region (1): 2018

Duluth Portside FC 
Duluth Portside FC is Duluth FC's second team that currently plays in the Duluth Amateur Soccer League, filling the void left by Duluth FC after they left for the American Premier League in 2016.

References

 http://goalnation.com/duluth-fcs-tim-sas-on-npsl-soccer/ 
 http://www.americanpyramidblog.com/home/the-north-is-green-and-blue-tim-saas-of-duluth-fc

External links
Official website
Npsl.bonzidev.com

2015 establishments in Minnesota
Association football clubs established in 2015
Soccer clubs in Minnesota
National Premier Soccer League teams